Benedetto Nicotra (born 6 November 1953) is an Italian politician.

He joined Forza Italia in 1994, following the dissolution of Christian Democracy and served on the Chamber of Deputies from 2001 to 2006.

References

External links

1953 births
Living people
Deputies of Legislature XIV of Italy
Forza Italia politicians
Place of birth missing (living people)